Rosa 'Diamond Jubilee' is a light yellow Hybrid tea rose developed in the United States in 1947 by Gene Boerner. The cultivar was named All-America Rose Selections (AARS) winner in 1948.

History
'Diamond Jubilee' was created by Eugene Boerner, director of the rose breeding program at Jackson & Perkins in America to celebrate the 75th anniversary of the company. The cultivar's stock parents are the Noisette, 'Maréchal Niel'  and Hybrid tea rose, Feu Pernet-Ducher. Jackson & Perkins introduced the rose in the US in 1947. The cultivar was introduced in Australia by Hazlewood Bros. Nursery in 1950 as 'Diamond Jubilee'.

Description
'Diamond Jubilee' is a medium upright shrub, 3 to 4.3 ft (91–130 cm) in height with a 2 ft (60 cm) spread. Blooms are 4-5 in (10-12  cm) in diameter, and generally have 26 to 40 petals.  Flowers are high-centered with a moderate to strong fragrance. Blooms are light yellow or pale gold in color with an apricot reverse, fading to cream at the edges.  'Diamond Jubilee' is very disease resistant and a good repeat bloomer. The optimal growing zone is United States Department of Agriculture USDA zone 6 and warmer. The flowers fall apart in the rain.

Awards
All-America Rose Selections, (1948)

See also
Garden roses
Rose Hall of Fame
List of Award of Garden Merit roses

References

Diamond Jubilee